Don't Look Down is the fourth studio album by Welsh singer-songwriter Cerys Matthews. It was released on 6 October 2009 by Rainbow City Recordings. A Welsh version of the album, entitled Paid Edrych I Lawr, was also released.

Critical reception 

Elly Roberts of aligigs described Don't Look Down as "a drastic shift from her debut solo, Cockahoop and its follow-up Never Said Goodbye," describing it as "very, very impressive." Jon O'Brien of AllMusic gave the album a review of four out of five stars, describing it as "a captivating and often magical album which yet again establishes Matthews as a songwriting force to be reckoned with."

Track listing

Charts

References

2009 albums
Cerys Matthews albums
Welsh-language albums